Playin' in the Yard is a live album by jazz keyboardist Hampton Hawes recorded at the 1973 Montreux Jazz Festival for the Prestige label. Hampton's trio with Bob Cranshaw and Kenny Clarke also backed Dexter Gordon at the same concert, and the recordings with Gordon were released as Blues à la Suisse. Both recordings are noteworthy for Hampton's use of the electric piano for many of the performances.

Track listing
All compositions by Hampton Hawes except as indication
 "Playin' in the Yard" (Sonny Rollins) - 10:57   
 "Double Trouble" - 8:53   
 "Pink Peaches" - 5:03   
 "De De" - 8:53   
 "Stella by Starlight" (Victor Young, Ned Washington) - 7:35

Personnel
Hampton Hawes - piano, electric piano
Bob Cranshaw - electric bass 
Kenny Clarke - drums

References

Hampton Hawes live albums
1973 live albums
Prestige Records live albums
Albums produced by Orrin Keepnews
Albums recorded at the Montreux Jazz Festival